Stillings is a surname. Notable people with the surname include:

Edward Stillings (1823–1890), American lawyer, politician, judge, and businessman
John Stillings (born 1955), American rower

See also
Stilling
Stillings, Missouri